The 1949 Davis Cup was the 38th edition of the most important tournament between national teams in men's tennis. 24 teams would enter the Europe Zone, and 4 teams would enter the America Zone. Israel made its first appearance in the competition.

Australia defeated Mexico in the America Zone final, and Italy defeated France in the Europe Zone final. Australia defeated Italy in the Inter-Zonal play-off, but fell to defending champions the United States in the Challenge Round, giving the Americans their 4th straight title and 16th overall. The final was played at the West Side Tennis Club in Forest Hills, New York, United States on 26–28 August.

America Zone

Draw

Final
Australia vs. Mexico

Europe Zone

Draw

Final
France vs. Italy

Inter-Zonal Final
Australia vs. Italy

Challenge Round
United States vs. Australia

References

External links
Davis Cup official website

 
Davis Cups by year
Davis Cup
Davis Cup
Davis Cup